The 2023 Nigerian Senate elections in Katsina State will be held on 25 February 2023, to elect the 3 federal Senators from Katsina State, one from each of the state's three senatorial districts. The elections will coincide with the 2023 presidential election, as well as other elections to the Senate and elections to the House of Representatives; with state elections being held two weeks later. Primaries were held between 4 April and 9 June 2022.

Background
In the previous Senate elections, only one incumbent senator was returned: in the North district, Ahmad Babba Kaita (APC) was re-elected but Umaru Ibrahim Kurfi (APC-Central) lost renomination and Abu Ibrahim (APC-South) retired. In the North district, Babba Kaita held his seat with 70% of the vote; both of the open seats were won by APC as Kabir Abdullahi Barkiya won the Central district with 72% and Bello Mandiya gained the South seat with 72% of the vote as well. These results were a part of a slight swing to the Katsina APC as most House of Representatives seats were won by the party, it won a majority in the House of Assembly, and Buhari won the state in the presidential election.

Overview

Summary

Katsina Central 

The Katsina Central Senatorial District covers the local government areas of Batagarawa, Batsari, Charanchi, Dan Musa, Dutsin-Ma, Jibia, Kaita, Katsina, Kurfi, Rimi, and Safana. The district is centered around the city of Katsina and is sometimes referred to as the "Katsina Zone." Incumbent Kabir Abdullahi Barkiya (APC) was elected with 72.4% of the vote in 2019. Abdullahi Barkiya sought re-election but lost renomination.

Primary elections

All Progressives Congress 

On the primary date, an indirect primary ended with the nomination of Abdul'aziz Musa Yar'adua—a retired Army colonel and brother of former President Umaru Musa Yar'Adua—emerging as the nominee by over former Senator Umaru Ibrahim Kurfi and incumbent Abdullahi Barkiya.

People's Democratic Party 

The primary resulted in the nomination of Sirajo Aminu Makera—former General Manager of the Katsina Housing Authority—over Hamisu Gambo by a margin of 40%.

General election

Results

Katsina North 

The Katsina North Senatorial District covers the local government areas of Baure, Bindawa, Daura, Dutsi, Nigeria, Ingawa, Kankia, Kusada, Mai'Adua, Mani, Mashi, Sandamu, and Zango. The district is centered around the city of Daura and is sometimes referred to as the "Daura Zone." The incumbent Ahmad Babba Kaita (PDP) was re-elected with 70.3% of the vote in 2019 as a member of the APC; he defected to the PDP in April 2022. He is running for re-election.

Primary elections

All Progressives Congress 

The primary resulted in a sizable win for Nasiru Sani Zangon Daura—House of Representatives member for Zango/Baure and son of former minister Sani Zangon Daura—over Mustapha Mahmud Kanti Bello—former Commissioner for Rural Development and son of former Senator Mahmud Kanti Bello. Zangon Daura won the majority of delegates' votes from every LGA except Ingawa and Mai'Adua, the delegates of both LGAs were won by Bello.

People's Democratic Party 

About a month before the primary, incumbent Senator Babba Kaita left the APC and joined the PDP after weeks of speculation; observers noted the negative relationship between Babba Kaita and Governor Aminu Bello Masari as a key reason for the defection. On the primary date, the sole screened candidate—Babba Kaita—gained the nomination unopposed. After the process, Babba Kaita thanked the party for welcoming him and pledged to bring in development projects to the district.

Campaign 
In the aftermath of party primaries, ThisDay analysis focused on the wave of defections from several of district's APC politicians to the PDP, NNPP, and SDP. By February, pundits noted how the incumbent APC state and federal administrations had helped Zangon Daura but the unpopularity of the APC hurt his campaign; for Babba Kaita, positive views of his tenure were thought to help him but the crisis within the Katsina PDP served as a detriment to his campaign.

General election

Results

Katsina South 

The Katsina South Senatorial District covers the local government areas of Bakori, Dandume, Danja, Faskari, Funtua, Kafur, Kankara, Malumfashi, Matazu, Musawa, and Sabuwa. The district is centered around the city of Funtua and is sometimes referred to as the "Funtua Zone." Incumbent Bello Mandiya (APC) was elected with 72.4% of the vote in 2019 and sought re-election but lost the APC nomination.

Primary elections

All Progressives Congress 

The primary ended in the nomination of Mohammed Muntari Dandutse—House of Representatives member for Funtua/Dandume—over incumbent Mandiya by a margin of 53%.

People's Democratic Party 

The primary ended in the nomination of Shehu Garba Matazu—former House of Representatives member for Matazu/Musawa—over Sani Anani by a margin of 51%.

General election

Results

Notes

See also 
 2023 Nigerian Senate election
 2023 Nigerian elections

References 

Katsina State senatorial elections
2023 Katsina State elections
Katsina State Senate elections